The Washington Damon House is a historic house in Reading, Massachusetts, exhibiting the adaptation of existing housing stock to new architectural style.  The -story wood-frame house was built in 1839, and was at the time a fairly conventional side hall Greek Revival house, although it has small wings on either side that also appear date to that period.  It was significantly renovated in 1906, when the wraparound porch was added, as was the Palladian window in the front gable end.  When made, these additions included Greek Revival elements that were sensitive to those already present on the structure.

The house was listed on the National Register of Historic Places in 1984.

See also
National Register of Historic Places listings in Reading, Massachusetts
National Register of Historic Places listings in Middlesex County, Massachusetts

References

Houses on the National Register of Historic Places in Reading, Massachusetts
Houses in Reading, Massachusetts
1839 establishments in Massachusetts